Sri Lanka Air Force Junior Command & Staff College is the Sri Lanka Air Force academic establishment providing training and education primarily to the mid-career officers of SLAF as well as to limited number of officers from Sri Lanka Navy, Sri Lanka Army and officers of various Allied forces. It is located at SLAF China Bay in Trincomalee and administrated by the Sri Lanka Air Force Academy.

Courses
 Junior Command and Staff Course (JC&SC) - Accredited to the General Sir John Kotelawala Defence University for the Post Graduate Diploma in Defence Management.
 Administrative and Performance Development Module for Base Commanders and Commanding Officers
 Orientation Programme for Officer selected for the Defence Services Command and Staff Course

See also
Naval and Maritime Academy
Officer Career Development Centre

References

External links
Junior Command & Staff College

Sri Lanka Air Force
Staff colleges in Sri Lanka
Business schools in Sri Lanka
Educational institutions established in 1999
Education in Eastern Province, Sri Lanka
1999 establishments in Sri Lanka
Colleges affiliated to General Sir John Kotelawala Defence University